S. Pavunraj is an Indian politician and incumbent member of the Tamil Nadu Legislative Assembly from the Poompuhar constituency. He represents the Anna Dravida Munnetra Kazhagam party. He passed 5th standard in Aathuppakkam school.

References 

All India Anna Dravida Munnetra Kazhagam politicians
Living people
Year of birth missing (living people)
Tamil Nadu MLAs 2011–2016
Tamil Nadu MLAs 2016–2021